Saunkh, often spelled as Sonkh, is a town and a Nagar Panchayat in Mathura district of Uttar Pradesh, India.

Archaeology
The site is well-known for archaeological excavations led by Herbert Härtel in 1969-70. Numerous artefacts recovered from Sonkh are visible in the Mathura Museum. Stratigraphical analysis at Sonkh and other sites has shown that the area of Mathura was almost undeveloped and Mathura was mostly a hamlet before the Mauyra era.

Coins of the Mitra dynasty were found in Sonkh, corresponding to layers dated to about 150-50 BCE, at a time when the Indo-Greeks ruled over the region. The earliest Mitra coins are those of Gomitra (150-50 BCE).

References

Cities and towns in Mathura district